Axia olga, the European gold moth, is a cimeliid moth found in Armenia and Russia. The species was first described by Otto Staudinger in 1899.

References

External links
 Taxon page on BioLib.cz. Accessed 27 March 2010.
 Taxon page on Zipcodezoo. Accessed 27 March 2010.
 

Cimeliidae
Insects of Turkey